Cynthia Rachel D. Selassie is an American bio-organic and medicinal chemist known for her work with quantitative structure-activity relationships (QSAR). She is the Blanche and Frank R. Seaver Professor of Science and Professor of Chemistry at Pomona College in Claremont, California.

Early life and education 
Selassie was a student of Corwin Hansch, who pioneered the concept of QSAR. She studied at Mount St. Mary's College, Duke University, and the University of Southern California, where she received her doctorate.

Career 
Selassie began teaching at Pomona College in 1990. She currently holds the Blanche and Frank R. Seaver Professor of Science and Professor of Chemistry endowed chair.

References

External links
Faculty page at Pomona College

Year of birth missing (living people)
Living people
Pomona College faculty
American chemists
American women chemists
Organic chemists
American pharmacologists
Women pharmacologists
21st-century American women